The Volpi Cup for Best Actor is the principal award given to actors at the Venice Film Festival and is named in honor of Count Giuseppe Volpi di Misurata, the founder of the Venice Film Festival. The name and number of prizes have been changed several times since their introduction, ranging from two to four awards per edition and sometimes acknowledging both leading and supporting performances.

The festival was officially competitive for the first time in 1934. The acting award was named Grande medaglia d'oro dell'Associazione Nazionale Fascista dello Spettacolo per il migliore attore (Great Gold Medal of the National Fascist Association for Entertainment for the Best Actor). After a four-year hiatus caused by the war, the festival was once again competitive in 1947. The acting award in the immediate post-war period was named Premio Internazionale per il migliore attore (International Award for the Best Actor). The festival was again competitive in 1980 but the acting awards given by the competition jury were not reinstated until 1983: the prizes were no longer called Coppa Volpi (Volpi Cup) but were simply referred to as Premio per il migliore attore (Best Actor Award). The winners did not receive cup-shaped awards but were instead given rectangular plaques. In 1988, for the first time in 20 years, the most recognizable prizes of the festival were re-established. The two acting award was officially named Coppa Volpi per la migliore interpretazione maschile (Volpi Cup for the Best Actor).

Winners
The following actors received the Volpi Cup or other major Best Actor Award:

Multiple winners
The following individuals have received multiple Best Actor awards:

See also 
The following individuals have also received Best Actor award(s) at Cannes or Berlin Film Festival.

Notes

A: Winner of the award was chosen by public voting.
B: Performer to receive a single award which honor the outstanding work in multiple different films in the same official competition slate.

References

External links
 Venice Film Festival on IMDb
 Enrico Lancia, I premi del cinema, Gremese Editore, 1998
 Coppa Volpi for best actors since 1935 from "La Biennale" website

Venice Film Festival
Awards for male actors
Film awards for lead actor
Awards established in 1932
1932 establishments in Italy
Film awards for supporting actor
 
Volpi Cup, Best Actor